Jacob M. Held is an American philosopher and Professor of Philosophy and Assistant Provost for Academic Assessment and General Education at the University of Central Arkansas. He is known for his work at the intersection of philosophy and popular culture.

Education
Held received a BS in Philosophy from the University of Wisconsin - Madison in 1998. He then attended the University of Wisconsin - Milwaukee, receiving an MA in Philosophy in 2000. His master's thesis was on John Rawls. He attended Marquette University from 2000-2005, receiving his PhD in December of 2005. His area of focus was 19th Century German philosophy. His dissertation, "Is there a Future for Marxist Humanism?" investigated the roots of ethical Marxism in the works of Fichte, Hegel, and Feuerbach and its legacy in critical theory, focusing on the work of Erich Fromm and Axel Honneth.

Popular Culture and Philosophy

Philosophy of Sex
Held's work in the philosophy of sex focuses primarily on issues related to the First Amendment, obscenity law, and pornography. He has published extensively on pornography, dealing with issues such as pornography and art, pornography and discrimination, and pornography and speech. He has also published on issues related to gender, sexuality, and gay marriage.

Books
 Dr. Seuss and Philosophy: Oh, the Thinks You Can Think
 More Dr. Seuss and Philosophy: Additional Hunches in Bunches
 Philosophy and Terry Pratchett (with James B. South)
 Wonder Woman and Philosophy: The Amazonian Mystique
 Roald Dahl and Philosophy: A Little Nonsense Now and Then
 Stephen King and Philosophy
 The Philosophy of Pornography: Contemporary Perspectives (with Lindsay Coleman)
 James Bond and Philosophy: Questions are Forever (with James B. South) 
 The Philosophy of Sex: Contemporary Readings, co-editor with Alan Soble, Sarah Hoffman and Raja Halwani, Rowman & Littlefield Publishers 2012

References

21st-century American philosophers
Philosophy academics
Living people
University of Central Arkansas faculty
Political philosophers
Year of birth missing (living people)